Ponnampalam Memorial hospital is located in  Puthukudiyiruppu  in Mullaitivu District.It was run by the LTTE in rebel controlled areas. It was bombed by the Sri Lankan airforce and the hospital was destroyed.
Human Rights Watch accused the Sri Lankan military of shelling hospitals in the Safe Zone indiscriminately with artillery and attacking them aerially beginning with the Mullaitivu General Hospital in December 2008 and including at least eight other hospitals.  Human Rights Watch stated that these attacks constitute war crimes.  They've also said that the hospitals are clearly marked.Report of the Secretary-General's Panel of Experts on Accountability in Sri Lanka found that the allegations that the Sri Lankan military shelled hospitals were credible.Gotabaya Rajapakse claimed that "No hospital should operate outside the Safety Zone...everything beyond the safety is a legitimate target," and stating the attack was legitimate. US Secretary of State Hillary Clinton and British Foreign Secretary David Miliband jointly called on the warring parties in the island of Sri Lanka to "not to fire out of or into" the safe zone and in the "vicinity of Puthukkudiyiruppu (PTK) hospital or any other medical structure".

References

2009 crimes in Sri Lanka
Attacks on civilians attributed to the Sri Lanka Air Force
Attacks on hospitals
Massacres in Sri Lanka
Mass murder in 2009
Mass murder of Sri Lankan Tamils
Sri Lankan government forces attacks in Eelam War IV
Building bombings in Sri Lanka
History of Mullaitivu District